René Clemencic (27 February 1928 – 8 March 2022) was an Austrian composer, recorder player, harpsichordist, conductor and clavichord player.

Biography
Born in Vienna, Austria, Clemencic was educated at the Vienna University and studied further in France, Netherlands and West Germany. He was director of the Capella Musica Antiqua and of the Drama Musicum in Vienna.

In 1958 he founded Musica Antiqua (known after 1959 as Ensemble Musica Antiqua) to perform early music on period instruments. Later, in 1968, he founded the Clemencic Consort.

Clemencic died on 8 March 2022, at the age of 94.

Compositions
 Meraviglia 1969
 Molière Film music for the film by Ariane Mnouchkine (1978)
 Missa Mundi mass in Latin, for five voices and orchestra (1981)
 Unus Mundus (1986)
 Drachenkampf ballet (1987)
 Kabbala Oratorio in Hebrew (1992)
 Der Berg chamber opera (1993)
 Apokalypsis Oratorio on the Greek text of the Revelation of John (1996)
 Stabat Mater - (2001)
 Monduntergang - Operelle for sirene Operntheater (2007)
 Nachts unter der steinernen Brücke - chamber opera for sirene Operntheater (2009)
 Harun und Dschafar - chamber opera for sirene Operntheater (2011)
 Gilgamesch - Oratorio in German for sirene Operntheater (2015)

Selected recordings
 Carmina Burana 5 LPs, 1975, reedition 3CDs Harmonia Mundi France.

References

External Links
 
 
 Webpage

1928 births
2022 deaths
Austrian male composers
Austrian composers
Austrian musicologists
Austrian classical musicians
Austrian conductors (music)
Austrian classical organists
University of Vienna alumni
Oehms Classics artists
Musicians from Vienna